Christian de Portzamparc (born 5 May 1944) is a French architect and urbanist.

He graduated from the École Nationale des Beaux Arts in Paris in 1970 and has since been noted for his bold designs and artistic touch; his projects reflect a sensibility to their environment and to urbanism that is a founding principle of his work.

In 1994 he was awarded the Pritzker Prize.

Life and career
De Portzamparc was born in Casablanca, Morocco in 1944, when that country was a French protectorate, to a family of Breton noble descent. He began studying architecture in 1962 at the École nationale supérieure des Beaux-Arts in Paris where he was influenced by professors Eugène Beaudouin, who "encouraged his taste for formal expressionism", and George Candilis, who "emphasized systematic work on grids and networks." In 1966 he traveled to New York where he spent a few months during a nine-month academic hiatus that was rooted in his hesitations about continuing in architecture— "Architecture seemed to me to be too bureaucratic, and not free enough compared to art; and the modernistic ideals which I worshiped before, seemed to me unable to reach the richness of real life. I also began to criticize my first influences like Le Corbusier". Nevertheless, he returned to his studies in the 1967 academic year and would graduate from the Beaux-Arts in 1969.  De Portzamparc created his agency in 1980, supported by Marie-Élisabeth Nicoleau, Étienne Pierrès and Bertrand Beau, and later welcomed Bruno Durbecq, Céline Barda, Léa Xu, André Terzibachian and Clovis Cunha. Based in Paris, the agency has 'satellite' offices near building sites, in addition to offices in New York and Rio de Janeiro, and represents a team of 80 people, drawn from all corners of the globe.

Both an architect and urban planner, Christian de Portzamparc is implicated in the research of form and meaning, as well as being a constructer. His work focuses on research over speculation and concerns the quality of life; aesthetics are conditioned by ethics, and he maintains that we have too often dissociated one from the other. Christian de Portzamparc focuses on all scales of construction, from simple buildings to urban re-think; the town is a founding principal of his work, developing in parallel and in crossover along three major lines: neighbourhood or city pieces, individual buildings and sky-scrapers.

The growth of Christian de Portzamparc's urban projects through competitions and studies led to an evolution of methods, a practical result of theoretical research and analysis. This renewed vision of urban structure, which he named the "open block" in the 80s, can be seen today through projects such as the Quartier Masséna - Seine Rive Gauche (since 1995), an entire neighbourhood of Paris, and at La Lironde (since 1991), in the south of France, both of which illustrate his master-planning and coordination techniques.

Christian de Portzamparc's buildings create environments wherein the interior and exterior spaces interpenetrate, working as catalysts in cityscape dynamics. This method of functioning came into play in major cultural programmes, often dedicated to dance and music. The most recent examples of which include a 1500-seat philharmonic hall, 300 seat chamber hall and 120 seat electro-acoustic hall in Luxembourg, completed in 2005, plus a unique 1800 seat concert hall that transforms into a 1300-seat opera house, which is under construction, amongst other music halls, as part of the project Cidade da Música in Rio de Janeiro, Brazil.

The towers created by Christian de Portzamparc have, since the beginning, been a result of his studies of the vertical and sculptural dimension, concentrating on the prismatic form, the most recognised example of which is the LVMH Tower created in 1995 in New York, USA, for which Christian de Portzamparc received many accolades, soon to be accompanied by the residential tower at 400 Park avenue in Manhattan, whose construction commenced in 2010.

In 1994, Christian de Portzamparc became the first French architect to gain the prestigious "Pritzker Architectural Prize", at the age of 50.

In 1999, he created the twenty-three story LVMH Tower on East 57th Street in New York City and, later, the LVMH's corporate headquarters on Avenue Montaigne in Paris, France.

In 2006, the Collège de France created a 53rd chair dedicated 'artistic creation', and called on Christian de Portzamparc to be its first occupant.

Principal completed projects
 1971-1974 Château d'eau, Marne la Vallée
 1975-1979 Les Hautes-Formes housing project, Paris
 1983-1987 Paris Opera Ballet School, Nanterre
 1985-1987 Beaubourg Cafe, Paris
 1988-1990 Musée Bourdelle, Paris
 1989-1991 Nexus II, Fukuoka, Japan
 1984-1995 The City of Music, Paris
 1991-1995 Tour de Lille, Lille
 1993-1999 Law courts, Courts of Justice, Grasse
 1993-2006 Centre of science, library and museum "Les Champs Libres", Rennes
 1994-1999 Extension of the Palais des Congrès Porte Maillot, Paris
 1995-1999 LVMH Tower, New York
 1997-2003 Embassy of France, Berlin
 2001-2004 Headquarters for the press group Le Monde, Paris
 1997-2005 Philharmonie Luxembourg
 2000-2006 "De Citadel", housing and commercial centre Almere
 2003-2013 Concert halls, cinema, school of music Cidade da Musica, Rio de Janeiro
 2007-2009 Musée Hergé, Louvain-la-Neuve, Belgium
 2011–2013 One57, a 75-story hotel/condominium tower in New York City
 2013–2017 Paris La Défense Arena, new home to the Racing 92 rugby team in Nanterre

Main projects achieved
 1991-2009 Development of the Lironde Gardens and construction of two Montpellier blocks
 1995-2009 Urban development of the Masséna district, Paris
 1998-2009 Croix Rousse Hospital, Lyon
 2001-2008 Société Générale towers, La Défense, Paris
 2002-2009 "400 Park Avenue South" residential tower in Manhattan, New York
 2003-2008 Renaissance Paris Wagram Hotel, Paris
 2006-2009 Regional hall, Hôtel de Région Rhône Alpes, Lyon
 2004-2008 Multiplex Europalaces-Gaumont, Rennes
 2004-2008 Residential development "La prairie au Duc", Nantes
 2004-2008 Bastide residential development in Bordeaux
 2011–2015 Amphitheater District in Metz

Awards and distinctions
 1988 - Equerre d'Argent – awarded by the press group Le Moniteur for the Dance School of the Paris Opera in Nanterre
 1989 - Commander of the Order of Arts and Letters – awarded by the French Ministry of Culture
 1990 - The Great Prize of Architecture of the City of Paris – awarded by the Mayor of Paris 
 1992 - Médaille d'Argent – awarded by the French Academy of Architecture
 1993 - Great National Prize of Architecture – awarded by the French Ministry of Urbanism and Transport
 1994 - Pritzker Prize of Architecture – awarded by the Hyatt Foundation
 1995 - Equerre d'Argent awarded by the French press group Le Moniteur for the City of Music – Conservatory of Music and Dance in Paris
 2001 - Businessweek and Architectural Record Award for the LVMH Tower in New York (USA)
 2004 - The Great Prize of Urbanism – awarded by an international jury who wanted to congratulate a work with achievements of high quality combined with city vision and philosophy articulating theoretical concepts and concrete realisations, while developing an optimistic vision for the future through his works and writings
 2005 - MIPIM Award for the remodelling of the building for the press group Le Monde in Paris

Publications and biographies
 Exhibition catalogue «Rêver la ville», Sophie Trelcat, Paris, Le Moniteur, 2007
 Architecture: figures du monde, figures du temps, Leçons inaugurales au Collège de France, Collège de France/Fayard, Paris, 2006
 Voir écrire, Christian de Portzamparc & Philippe Sollers, Paris, Folio Gallimard, 2005
 Christian de Portzamparc by Gilles de Bure Edited by Terrail, 2003
 Christian de Portzamparc, entretien avec Y. Futagawa, G.A. Document extra 04 / in Studio Talk interview with 15 architects (Tokyo, A.D.A edita, 2002
 Christian de Portzamparc by Riccardo Florio, Edited by Officina Edizioni, 1997
 Christian de Portzamparc G.A. Document, 1996
 Christian de Portzamparc Disegno e forma dell'architettura per la città, R.Florio (Roma, Officina Edizioni, 1996)
 Généalogie des formes by Christian de Portzamparc, Edited by Dis Voir, about free drawings and paintings, 1996
 Christian de Portzamparc Edited by Arc en Rêve/ Birkhauser, 1996
 Scènes d'Atelier Edited by Centre Georges Pompidou, 1996
 Christian de Portzamparc by Jean Pierre Le Dantec Edited by Le Regard, 1996
 Christian de Portzamparc Urban situations Edited by Gallery MA - Tokyo - Japan 1991
 Christian de Portzamparc Published by Le Moniteur, 1984–1987

Books on projects
 La philharmonie de Luxembourg, entretien avec C. de Portzamparc, M. Brausch. (Luxembourg, Fonds d'Urbanisation et d'Aménagement du Plateau de Kirchberg, 2003)
 La tour LVMH, entretien avec C. de Portzamparc «Portzamparc ou l'esprit des lieux». «Christian de Portzamparc The LVMH Tower», J. Giovannini, 	F.Rambert, (Connaissance des Arts hors série, Paris, 1999)
 De la danse - école du ballet de L'Opéra de Paris, C. de Portzamparc  (Paris, Les éditions du Demi-Cercle, 1990)
 La cité de la musique, M. Bleuse, P. Boulez, S. Goldberg, J-C. Casadesus, O. Messiaen, P. Sollers, H. Tonka, C. de Portzamparc (Paris, Champ Vallon, 1986)
 Rue des Hautes Formes, C. de Portzamparc (Paris, Régie immobilière de la ville de Paris, RIVP, 1979)

References

 Paris 2000 New Architecture by Sam Lubell, The Monacelli Press

External links

 Official site
 Masséna urban plan review. a+t architecture publishers

20th-century French architects
21st-century French architects
Modernist architecture in France
Pritzker Architecture Prize winners
Skyscraper architects
1944 births
Living people
People from Casablanca
Chevaliers of the Légion d'honneur
Commandeurs of the Ordre des Arts et des Lettres
Officers of the Ordre national du Mérite
École des Beaux-Arts alumni
French people of Breton descent